Michael Hearne (died 1954) was an Irish Fianna Fáil politician. He was a member of Seanad Éireann from April to August 1938, and from 1943 to 1954. He was first elected to the 2nd Seanad in April 1938 by the Industrial and Commercial Panel, but lost his seat at the August 1938 election. He was re-elected at the 1943 Seanad election by the Administrative Panel. He was again elected at the 1944, 1948 and 1951 elections until losing his seat at the 1954 election.

References

Year of birth missing
1954 deaths
Members of the 2nd Seanad
Members of the 4th Seanad
Members of the 5th Seanad
Members of the 6th Seanad
Members of the 7th Seanad
Fianna Fáil senators